North Newbald is a village in the East Riding of Yorkshire, England. It lies to the east of the A1034 road.

History
In 1823 North Newbald was a village and civil parish in the Wapentake of Harthill and the Liberty of St Peter's. The North Newbald civil parish contained the hamlet of South Newbald. A stretch of land was purchased to provide a rental which was "distributed every New Year's Day to 20 resident parishioners, who have never received parochial relief". Population at the time was 543, with occupations including six farmers, two blacksmiths, two bricklayers, two shopkeepers, and a tailor, and the public house landlords of The Tiger; The New Inn, who was also a butcher; and The Rose & Crown, who was also a corn miller. Resident in the village were fourteen yeomen, and the schoolmaster who was a collector of taxes. A carrier operated between the village and Hull twice a week, and Market Weighton and Beverley once a week.

Governance
North Newbald along with the hamlet of South Newbald forms the civil parish of Newbald.

The village was in the Haltemprice and Howden  parliamentary constituency until the 2010 general election when it was transferred to the constituency of Beverley and Holderness.

Community
North Newbald is a village consisting of about 800 people of all ages. The village has two public houses, The Tiger and The Gnu (originally the New Inn when owned by The Hull Brewery Company), situated across the road from each other, privately run businesses and a number of farms. The main occupations in Newbald involve farming, eggs, warehousing and transport. It has been a carting village for some centuries.

Located on the communal village green is the whipping post used in the last public flogging carried out in Britain.

The parish church of St Nicholas was designated a Grade I listed building in 1968 and is now recorded in the National Heritage List for England, maintained by Historic England. Built about 1140, it has been described as the "finest Norman church in East Yorkshire". It has a cruciform plan without aisles and with a tall central tower. Four  Norman doorways make the building rare. Pevsner describes the church as the most complete Norman church in the East Riding. The church has a Coronation Clock which was installed at the coronation of George V in 1911.

A previous vicar of Newbald, Rev Jack Walker, during his incumbency mapped the whole area and produced detailed drawings suggesting that the village may have been walled. Apart from Rev Walker's submissions there is no further evidence of this.

The Yorkshire Wolds Way National Trail, a long distance footpath passes to the east of the village.

Buses run about three times a week to Beverley.

Three local sporting teams play at the village playing fields: Newbald Utd, Newbald A.F.C., and Newbald North End F.C.

References
Notes

Bibliography

Villages in the East Riding of Yorkshire